The Human Growth Foundation is a nonprofit group that works with people with growth deficiencies. It is financed mainly by Genentech and Caremark. In 1994 it published a study that concluded that 20,000 children needed human growth hormone because of their growth deficiencies.

See also
MAGIC Foundation
Little People of America

References

External links 

 Official website

Patients' organizations
Disability organizations based in the United States
Growth disorders
501(c)(3) organizations